The Senegalese local elections of 2022 took place on 23 January 2022 in order to renew the members of the municipal councils as well as the mayors of Senegal. Departmental elections were held on the same day.

They were originally scheduled for 2019, but were postponed.

Results

References 

Local
Senegal
Senegal
Local elections in Senegal
Elections postponed due to the COVID-19 pandemic